Deportivo Ayutla is a football club from Ayutla, San Marcos, Guatemala. It currently plays on the Segunda División de Ascenso, third tier on Guatemalan football.

Current squad

References 
http://fedefutguate.org

 
Football clubs in Guatemala